Rangraz Kola (also Romanized as Rangraz Kolā) is a village in Lalehabad Rural District, Lalehabad District, Babol County, Mazandaran Province, Iran. At the 2006 census, its population was 42, in 10 families.

References 

Populated places in Babol County